Bolt The Duer (foaled 2009) is a bay Standardbred racehorse who set or equaled two World Records for one mile.

Racing career
Bolt The Duer was bred at Carter Duer's Peninsula Farm in Lexington, Kentucky and would be purchased for $70,000 at the 2010 Harrisburg Yearling Sale. He was trained for owners John Como Sr. and John Jr. by Australian native Peter Foley for whom he won six of eight starts and $214,058 while competing as a two-year-old. He has won 23 different races, including the Kentucky Sire Stakes.

Triple Crown races
On November 10, 2012, Bolt The Duer won the 57th edition of the Messenger Stakes, the third leg of the Pacing Triple Crown run that year at Yonkers Raceway. Driven by former Canadian driving champion Mark MacDonald, Bolt The Duer's winning time of 1:51 2/5 for the mile was the fastest time for the Messenger Stakes when held at that racetrack.

World records
On July 28, 2012 at The Meadows Racetrack three-year-old Bolt The Duer won the Adios Pace with Mark MacDonald driving. His winning time of 1:47 4/5 was a new world record for one mile on a 5/8 mile oval.

At age four, in the Ben Franklin Consolation  at Pocono Downs, Bolt The Duer posted another win in 1:47 4/5 to make him the first horse in harness racing history to record wins in two sub-1:48 times over a five-eighths mile track. He would also equal a second world record for a half-mile track with a time of 1:49 while winning the Joe Gerrity Jr. Memorial Free-For-All Pace at Saratoga Raceway.

Retirement to stud
While preparing for the 2015 racing season, Bolt The Duer suffered a torn hind suspensory ligament and was retired. He stands at stud at Winbak Farm in Walden, New York. The first foal born from him was born at Winbank Farm in Maryland in 2017.

External links
 Video of Bolt The Duer's World Record in the 2012 Adios Pace

References

2009 racehorse births
American Standardbred racehorses
Harness racing in the United States
Messenger Stakes winners